Indie Pogo is an indie crossover fighting video game developed and published by Lowe Bros. Studios. The game features characters and settings from more than 50 different indie games, such as Shovel Knight, VVVVVV, Teslagrad, the Bit.Trip series, and Freedom Planet. After being successfully funded via Kickstarter in October 2017, the game was released on Microsoft Windows in July 2018. A Nintendo Switch version is currently in development.

Gameplay 
Indie Pogo is a platform fighter, in which up to four players battle across one of several open arenas with platforms, and attempt to defeat opponents by depleting their health or knocking them off the screen. Unlike other fighting games, the primary gameplay mechanic of Indie Pogo is auto-jumping: characters landing on the ground or a platform will automatically jump back into the air. Every character has access to a set of aerial melee attacks and special moves derived from those used in their original game, such as Shovel Knight wielding his Relics, or Captain Viridian inverting their own gravity. Characters can also perform a double-jump, a directional air-dodge, a mid-air grab, parkour movement on the ground and walls, and a charge-based attack that keeps them on the ground until the button is released. During a battle, players can initiate a "pogo combo" by repeatedly bouncing off opponents' heads without taking damage, ending when the character touches the ground. The player will gain gems by performing a successful pogo combo, and can use five of their gems to activate a character-specific super move. An update in May 2019 added optional gameplay modifiers called "Augments", up to three of which can be equipped to a character before a battle. For example, the "Air Jump" augment gives the character an additional mid-air jump, while the "Double Edged" augment doubles the amount of damage a character both deals and takes. The game currently features 15 stages to battle on, with many stages featuring unlockable alternate layouts to choose from.

The game includes a basic arcade mode that pits players against a series of opponents, culminating in a battle against the game's final boss, Crow from Starblade's Nefarious. Players can also participate in Challenge Mode, which tasks them with completing specific scenarios similar to the Event Matches in Super Smash Bros.; Infinite Pogo, in which they must defeat as many opponents as possible before their character's health is depleted; and a traditional training mode in which they can practice against an AI opponent. The game supports local four-player battles, as well as online matchmaking. Players will earn coins after each battle, which can be used at an in-game shop to purchase new characters, stages, character skins, profile emblems, and taunts; additional skins and emblems are available as premium downloadable content. Collectible in-game trophies based on other indie titles can also be obtained via completing arcade mode with each character, winning them from a bonus game, or spending coins at a gashapon machine.

Characters 
The game featured 14 playable characters at launch. As of October 2021, five additional characters have been added via free updates, with four other characters planned for inclusion for a total of 23.

Notes

Development
Indie Pogo drew inspiration during development from the Super Smash Bros. series and an iOS game called Slam Bots, in an effort to make a multiplayer version of that game. According to game director Trevor Lowe, the auto-jumping mechanic "keeps gameplay always in motion". The game was self-funded by Lowe Bros. Studios for three years before launching a Kickstarter campaign on September 12, 2017 with a $25,000 funding goal. By the end of the campaign, the game had raised nearly $42,000.

Reception 
Indie Pogo was positively received by critics. PushDustIn of Source Gaming praised it for being easy to get into and said that the game was "everything [he] wanted out of an Indie crossover fighting game". Ryan Silberman of The Inner Circle Games Network stated that Indie Pogo was a love letter to the Indie industry, and that the developers "went for a quality-over-quantity approach".

Notes

References

External links 

2018 video games
Crossover fighting games
Crowdfunded video games
GameMaker Studio games
Indie video games
Kickstarter-funded video games
Nintendo Switch games
Platform fighters
Video games developed in the United States
Windows games
Multiplayer and single-player video games